Ersmark is a locality situated in Umeå Municipality, Västerbotten County, Sweden with 1,613 inhabitants in 2010.

References

External links
Ersmark at Umeå Municipality

Populated places in Umeå Municipality